Beyond Words may refer to:

Beyond Words Publishing, an American book publishing company
Beyond Words (1997 film), Dutch documentary film by Louis van Gasteren
Beyond Words (2017 film), Dutch-Polish drama film by Urszula Antoniak
Beyond Words (TV series), 2016 Malaysian TV series